Owambarctia owamboensis is a moth of the family Erebidae. It was described by Sergius G. Kiriakoff in 1957. It is found in Namibia.

References

Endemic fauna of Namibia
Syntomini
Moths described in 1957